The Lohbach (in its lower range Gießenbach) is a river of Tyrol, Austria, in the municipal area of Innsbruck, a tributary of the Inn.

The Lohbach originates from a spring at the eastern edge of the  ravine.
At the street Fischerhäuslweg its name changes to Gießenbach and it runs under ground until it discharges into the Inn. A part of the river branches off and flows into the airport area.

References

Rivers of Tyrol (state)
Rivers of Austria